Bastanès is a commune in the Pyrénées-Atlantiques department in the Nouvelle-Aquitaine region of south-western France.

Geography
Bastanès is in the former province of Béarn some 12 km east by south-east of Sauveterre-de-Béarn and some 13 km south of Orthez. Access to the commune is by the D947 road from Loubieng in the north which passes south-east through the western part of the commune and the village and continues south-east to Navarrenx. The D27 branches off the D947 near the village and goes north-west to Bugnein. The commune is mainly farmland in the south-west with the rest mixed forest and farmland.

The Gave d'Oloron forms the south-western border of the commune as it flows north-west to join the Gave de Pau at Peyrehorade. The Saleys river forms the north-eastern border of the commune as it flows north-west to eventually join the Gave d'Oloron east of Saint-Pé-de-Léren. The Barthes stream rises just east of the village and flows north-west to join the Gave d'Oloron at Audaux. The Hérre river rises in the east of the commune and flows north-west to join the Saleys east of Castetbon.

Places and hamlets

 Aresteron
 Banche
 Les Barthes
 Bernadou (ruins)
 Boussaque
 Briscain
 Les Camous
 Caulongue
 Les Coustères
 La Hittau
 Hourquet
 Laberdesque
 Labrenabe
 Lacoste
 Lanusse
 Laplacette
 Lassègue
 Lompré-de-Haut
 Manibelle
 Le Moulin
 La Plaine
 Puyounè
 Ribeton

Toponymy

The commune name in Gascon Occitan is also Bastanès. According to Michel Grosclaude the name comes from the gascon basta meaning "gorse" with an obscure suffix, probably giving "moorish terrain".

The following table details the origins of the commune name and other names in the commune.

Sources:

Raymond: Topographic Dictionary of the Department of Basses-Pyrenees, 1863, on the page numbers indicated in the table. 
Grosclaude: Toponymic Dictionary of communes, Béarn, 2006 
Cassini: 1750 Cassini Map
Cassini1: 1790 Cassini Map
Ldh/EHESS/Cassini: 

Origins:
Marca: Pierre de Marca, History of Béarn.
Luntz: Contracts retained by Luntz
Notaries: Notaries of Navarrenx
Reformation: Reformation of Béarn
Insinuations: Insinuations of the Diocese of Oloron

History
Paul Raymond noted on page 23 of his 1863 dictionary that in 1385 Bastanès had 28 fires and depended on the bailiwick of Navarrenx.

Administration

List of Successive Mayors

Intercommunality
The commune is part of five inter-communal structures:
the Communauté de communes du Béarn des Gaves;
the AEP association of Navarrenx;
the energy association of Pyrénées-Atlantiques;
the tax collection association of Navarrenx;
the inter-communal association of the Gaves and the Saleys.

Demography
In 2017 the commune had 99 inhabitants.

Economy
Economic activity is mainly agricultural - livestock, pastures, and corn. The commune is included in the Appellation d'origine contrôlée of Ossau-iraty

Culture and heritage

Religious heritage
The Parish Church of Saint-Laurent (1860) is registered as an historical monument.

Sports
The commune was on the route of the 16th stage of the Tour de France in 2007 on the 25 July. The stage was 218 km from Orthez to the Col d'Aubisque at Gourette.

See also
Communes of the Pyrénées-Atlantiques department

References

Communes of Pyrénées-Atlantiques